Sea bamboo is a common name for several organisms and may refer to:

Ecklonia maxima, a species of kelp
Isididae, a family of coral